Serhiy Laktionov (born 3 October 1967) is a Ukrainian retired professional footballer who played as a midfielder player and currently is working as a coach.

Career
Born in Hola Prystan Raion, Laktionov is a product of the Piddubny Olympic College in Kyiv.

His football career also included other Ukrainian clubs from different leagues (including Vyshcha Liha). He also spent two years as legionnaire in Russia.

After retirement from playing career, he worked as a football trainer in amateur football team Zorya from Haivoron and currently is an assistant manager since 2010.

References

External links
 Profile at Official UAF website (in Ukrainian)
 Profile at footballfacts.ru (in Russian)

1967 births
Living people
Ukrainian footballers
Soviet footballers
Association football midfielders
Soviet Second League players
Ukrainian Premier League players
Ukrainian First League players
Ukrainian Second League players
FC Zirka Kropyvnytskyi players
FC CSKA Kyiv players
FC Sula Lubny players
CSF Bălți players
FC Kremin Kremenchuk players
FC Oleksandriya players
FC Neftekhimik Nizhnekamsk players
FC Nyva Ternopil players
FC Yevropa Pryluky players
Ukrainian expatriate footballers
Ukrainian expatriate sportspeople in Russia
Expatriate footballers in Russia
Ukrainian football managers
Sportspeople from Kherson Oblast